HTMS Tachin was a Royal Thai Navy sloop and training ship, built by the Uraga Dock Company in Yokosuka, Japan. The ship is named after a river, Tha Chin River.

Construction and commissioning
The Royal Thai Navy has a project called "Naval Maintenance Project"  which is a project that provides warships to protect the country, the project was successful in the reign of King Rama VIII in 1935. In this project Royal Thai Navy gets two-ship HTMS Maeklong and HTMS Tachin. Royal keel-laying ceremony for HTMS Tachin was held on 24 July 1936, at the Uraga Dock Company, Japan.

Service history
HTMS Tachin commissioned on 10 June 1937, at the late of the Franco-Thai War. When entering the World War II, not long after Thailand was attacked by air-sides from the Allied aircraft at all times. On June, at Sattahip Bay area with a fleet of about 10-15 aircraft attacking on a Thai fleet lurking near a small island with 250 kilograms bombs on the port side of HTMS Tachin hitting the main engine room piercing the ship's deck and exploding in the water. HTMS Tachin broken by the seam of the ship in main engine room flood with heavy damage was unusable. Royal Thai Navy tried to repair her, but she was not functioning as good as before. Finally, she was decommissioned in 1945 in Sattahip District, Chon Buri Province.

References

1936 ships
Ships built by Uraga Dock Company
Ships of the Royal Thai Navy
Japan–Thailand military relations
World War II frigates